Shirpy is a rural locality (a village) in Khokhlovskoye Rural Settlement, Permsky District, Perm Krai, Russia. The population was 4 as of 2010. There are 13 streets.

Geography 
Shirpy is located 51 km north of Perm (the district's administrative centre) by road. Verkhnyaya Khokhlovka is the nearest rural locality.

References 

Rural localities in Permsky District